Rough and Ready is a 1927 American silent Western film directed by Albert S. Rogell and starring Jack Hoxie, Ena Gregory and Marin Sais.

Cast
 Jack Hoxie as Ned Raleigh
 Ena Gregory as Beth Stone
 Jack Pratt as 'Parson' Smith
 William Steele as Morris Manning 
 Monte Montague as 'Rawhide' Barton
 Clark Comstock as John Stone
 Marin Sais as Martha Bowman
 Bert De Marc as Bill Blake

References

Bibliography
 Rainey, Buck. Sweethearts of the Sage: Biographies and Filmographies of 258 actresses appearing in Western movies. McFarland & Company, 1992.

External links
 

1927 films
1927 Western (genre) films
1920s English-language films
American black-and-white films
Universal Pictures films
Films directed by Albert S. Rogell
Silent American Western (genre) films
1920s American films